Grevesmühlen is a municipality in Mecklenburg-Vorpommern, northern Germany. It was the seat of the Nordwestmecklenburg district until 2011, when Wismar became the seat. It is situated 33 km east of Lübeck, and 29 km northwest of Schwerin. It is part of the Hamburg Metropolitan Region.

History
The name Grevesmühlen goes back as far as 1226, which makes it one of the oldest towns in Mecklenburg-Vorpommern.

Personalities
Carsten Jancker
Manfred W. Jürgens
Rudolph Karstadt
Astrid Kumbernuss
Jens Voigt

References

Cities and towns in Mecklenburg
Nordwestmecklenburg
Populated places established in the 13th century
1260s establishments in the Holy Roman Empire
1261 establishments in Europe
Grand Duchy of Mecklenburg-Schwerin